Tarako is a Japanese singer.

Tarako may also refer to:
Tarako (food), Japanese salted cod roe
Tarako, a Kōtarō Makaritōru! character
"Tarako", a 1984 song by Tony Haynes

People with the name
Tarako Kotobuki, creator of Love Pistols, a Japanese yaoi manga series

See also
Tappuri! Tarako Man or Masa Takanashi, wrestler
"Tarako Tarako Tarako", a 2006 song by Kigurumi

Japanese feminine given names